Eurygnathohippus is an extinct genus of hipparionine horse. The majority of known fossils of members of this genus were discovered in Africa, where members of this genus lived during the late Miocene to Pleistocene interval. Fossils of Eurygnathohippus were also reported from the late Pliocene sediments of the Potwar Plateau in Pakistan and the Siwalik Hills in northwest India.

References

Miocene horses
Prehistoric placental genera
Pliocene horses
Miocene mammals of Africa
Pleistocene mammals of Africa
Pliocene mammals of Africa
Pliocene mammals of Asia
Pleistocene horses
Fossil taxa described in 1932